Yakir Yerushalayim is an annual citizenship prize in Jerusalem, inaugurated in 1967.

The prize is awarded annually by the municipality of the City of Jerusalem to one or more residents of the city who have contributed to the cultural and educational life of the city in some outstanding way. Prize recipients must be over 65 years old. They are selected by a five-panel committee appointed by the mayor, which reviews the candidates and selects a long-time resident of Jerusalem whose work on behalf of the city or life story is an inspiration to others. The award ceremony is held on Yom Yerushalayim.

Recommendations for the award are submitted by city council members. The final selection among the nominees takes place in the spring.

Recipients
Note: The table can be sorted alphabetically or chronologically using the  icon.

See also
 Israel Prize

References

External links
 (in Hebrew)

1967 establishments in Israel
Awards established in 1967
Culture of Jerusalem
Municipal awards
Israeli awards
Lists of Israeli award winners
Jerusalem-related lists